This is a list of eminent people from Hyderabad, the capital of Telangana State of India. A person from Hyderabad is called a Hyderabadi. People born in Hyderabad, of Hyderabadi descent, or those who have spent a large part of their career in Hyderabad are included.

Academics
 Rafi Ahmed, Indo-American virologist and immunologist.
 Saleh Muhammad Alladin, astronomer
 Muhammad Hamidullah
 Zakir Hussain
 Ali Yavar Jung, former Vice Chancellor of Osmania University and Aligarh University
 Mohammed Vizarat Rasool Khan, founder of Shadan Group of Institutions
 Yousuf Hussain Khan, Pro-Vice-Chancellor, Aligarh University

Advocates 

 Cara Elizabeth Yar Khan

Arts, music and cinema
 Mast Ali, actor
 Rashid Ali, singer
 Ali Asgar, actor and comedian.
 Talat Aziz (1956-), ghazal singer
 Mohammad Ali Baig, producer-director, heads the Hyderabad-based Qadir Ali Baig Theatre Foundation
 Shyam Benegal  (1934-), director and screenwriter
 Sreerama Chandra, singer
 Sherlyn Chopra (1984-), model, actor, singer
 Rana Daggubati (1984-), actor, producer
 Gifton Elias (1987-), composer, conductor
 Farah (1968-), Bollywood actor
 Diana Hayden (1973-), Miss World
 Vedala Hemachandra, singer
 Aditi Rao Hydari, actor
 Hyderabad Brothers (D. Raghavachari and D. Seshachari), Carnatic music duo
 Mohammed Irfan, playback singer
 N. C. Karunya (1986-), singer
 Ajit Khan (1922–98), actor, film maker.
 Ateeq Hussain Khan (1980-), qawwali, musician
 Kabir Khan, film director
 Razak Khan (1958-2016), actor, comedian, director.
 Rohit Khandelwal (1989-), actor, Mr.world
 Anjali Parvati Koda, playwright, stand-up comedian
 Nagesh Kukunoor (1967-), filmmaker, screenwriter
 Gopichand Lagadapati, actor, writer, director, producer
 Vennu Mallesh, singer
 Asmita Marwa, fashion designer
 Dia Mirza (1981-), model, actor, Miss Asia pacific International
 Aziz Naser (1980-), actor
 Vivek Oberoi (1976-), actor
 Shashi Preetam (1970-), music-director 
 Priyadarshi Pulikonda, actor
 Bairu Raghuram (1949-), painter 
 Radhika Rao (1976-), writer, director, filmmaker
 Vithal Rao (1929-2015), ghazal singer
 Rathna Shekar Reddy (1908-), theatre and film actor, founder of Samahaara
 Payal Rohatgi (1980 or 1984-), actor
 Sushmita Sen (1975-), actor, Miss Universe
 Mani Shankar (1957-), filmmaker
 Tabu (1971-), actor
 Vinay Varma theatre. film and voice actor, scriptwriter, casting director, founder Sutradhar
 Warsi Brothers, qawwali group
Anwar Maqsood, Pakistani actor, playwright, lyricist, satirist
Manasa Varanasi, Miss india world 2021

Business
 Fazal Nawaz Jung (c. 1894–1964), financier and politician
 Ravi Kailas businessman
 Mehboob Alam Khan, restaurateur 
 Shah Alam Khan (1921-2017)
 Prem Watsa, CEO of Fairfax Financial Holdings (1950–present)

Civil servants and diplomats
 Syed Akbaruddin
 Abid Hussain (1926–2012), diplomat
 Idris Hasan Latif, former Indian ambassador to France
 Ausaf Sayeed (1989–present), diplomat

Information technology
Satya Nadella, CEO OF Microsoft Corporation
Shantanu Narayen, CEO and President of Adobe Systems

Literature
 Amjad Hyderabadi (1878-1961), Urdu poet
 Khamakha Hyderabadi (1929 - 2017), poet and writer.
 Jwalamukhi (1938 – 2008), poet, novelist, essayist and political activist
 Sarojini Naidu (1879 – 1949), poet and political activist
 Jameela Nishat (1955), Urdu poet, feminist and social activist
 Maharaja Sir Kishen Pershad (pen name: Shad) (1864-1940), scholar of Urdu, Arabic and Persian
 Sayyid Ahmedullah Qadri (1909 – 1985), poet, journalist, writer, translator, literary critic, educationist and politician
 Sayyid Shamsullah Qadri (1885-1953), historian
 Ali Haider Tabatabai or Syed Ali Hyder Nazm Tabatabai (1854-1933), poet and translator
 Naseer Turabi (1945 - 2021) Urdu poet
 Mohiuddin Qadri Zore (1905 – 1962), poet, literary critic and historian

Media and television
 Baseer Ali, reality TV Star
 Harsha Bhogle, cricket commentator and journalist
 Rajiv Chilaka, creator and director of animated TV and film
 Anees Jung (b. 1944), author and journalist

Military
 Mateen Ansari (1916-1943), George Cross recipient
 Idris Hasan Latif (1923-2018), former Chief of Air Staff of the Indian Air Force
 Mohammad Ahmed Zaki, former Lieutenant General and Vir Chakra recipient

Sports

Badminton
 Pullela Gopichand, All England badminton winner; coach of Indian badminton team
 Jwala Gutta, doubles player, quarterfinalist in 2012 Olympics 
 Parupalli Kashyap, olympian, won gold medal at 2014 commonwealth games
 Srikanth Kidambi, Indonesia open winner
 Shruti Kurien, former doubles player
 Saina Nehwal, former world no. 1
 Ashwini Ponnappa, 2011 world badminton championship bronze medalist
 B. Sai Praneeth, Swiss grand prix open 2018
 P. V. Sindhu, won a Silver medal at 2016 Rio Olympics

Cricket
 Mohammad Azharuddin, former captain of Indian Cricket Team
 Ghulam Ahmed, test player
 Syed Abid Ali, former cricketer 
 Arshad Ayub (1987–1990)
 Abbas Ali Baig
 Noel David, former cricketer
 Syed Mohammad Hadi, nicknamed Indian Rainbow Hadi
 M. L. Jaisimha, known as 'cultivated stylist' in cricket team
 V. V. S. Laxman, former Indian cricketer
 C. K. Nayudu (1895–1967), first captain of the Indian test cricket team
 Pragyan Ojha, former Indian cricketer 
 Mithali Raj, Indian woman cricket team captain
 Venkatapathy Raju, former Indian cricketer 
 Ambati Rayudu, Indian professional cricket player
 Mohammed Siraj, Indian cricketer
 Gouher Sultana, Indian woman cricketer
 Shivlal Yadav (1979–1987), former Indian cricketer

Football
 Shabbir Ali
 Yousuf Khan
 Syed Nayeemuddin, former captain of the Indian football team
 Syed Abdul Rahim

Hockey
 Mukesh Kumar, former Indian Hockey Player

Tennis
 Syed Mohammad Hadi
 Sania Mirza

Bodybuilding
 Mir Mohtesham Ali Khan, Mr. World 2007(silver)
 Esa Misri
 Osman Misri

Others
 Abdul Basith (volleyball)
 Naina Ashwin Kumar (table tennis)

Politics
 Zakir Husain (1897-1969), 3rd President of India
 Mohammad Majid Hussain, former Mayor of Hyderabad
 Mohammed Vizarat Rasool Khan, former MLA
 Amanullah Khan
 Idris Hasan Latif (1923-2018), former Governor of Maharashtra
 Danam Nagender, former MLA and Minister of Labour
 Aruna Miller, politician 
 Akbaruddin Owaisi, MLA, present MLA and Managing Director of Owaisi Hospital
 Asaduddin Owaisi, MP, present MP of Hyderabad and chairman of Dar-us-salaam Trust
 Sultan Salahuddin Owaisi, former MLA and President of AIMIM
 Syed Ahmed Pasha Quadri, MLA and General secretary of AIMIM
 G. Sanjeeva Reddy President INTUC, Former MP and Minister of Labour,
 Nallari Kiran Kumar Reddy, former Chief Minister of Andhra Pradesh
 Mohammed Ali Shabbir, politician

Recipients of National Awards

Bharat Ratna
 Zakir Husain, former President of India.

Padma Vibhushan
 Zakir Husain, former President of India.
 Ali Yavar Jung, former Governor of Maharashtra

Padma Bhushan
 Chiranjeevi, film actor and politician
 Abid Hussain, diplomat
 Ali Yavar Jung, former Governor of Maharashtra
 Yousuf Hussain Khan, educationist
 Sania Mirza, tennis player.
 Saina Nehwal, badminton player

Padma Shri
 Mohammad Azharuddin
 Mohan Babu, film actor and producer 
 Mohammad Ali Baig, theatre activist
 Mujtaba Hussain
 Bilkees I. Latif, social worker
 Sayyid Ahmedullah Qadri, poet, journalist, writer, translator, literary critic, educationist and politician
 Mithali Raj, Indian Women Cricket Team captain
 S. S. Rajamouli, film director and screenwriter
 P. V. Sindhu, badminton player
 Shantha Sinha, anti-child labour activist
 Mohammad Ahmed Zaki, former Lieutenant General

Nizams of Hyderabad
 Qamar-ud-din Khan, Asif Jah I
 Nizam Ali Khan, Asaf Jah II
 Mir Akbar Ali Khan, Asaf Jah III
 Nasir-ud-dawlah, Asaf Jah IV
 Afzal ad-Dawlah, Asaf Jah V
 Mahbub Ali Khan, Asaf Jah VI
 Osman Ali Khan, Asaf Jah VII

See also

 List of notable Hyderabadi Muslims

References 

Hyderabad
People